Mehmet Ubeydullah Hatipoğlu, also known as Ubeydullah Bey or Ubeydullah Efendi (1858 – 1937) was an Ottoman politician during the imperial period.

References 

1858 births
1937 deaths
People from İzmir
Politicians of the Ottoman Empire